Operation Kurukuru is an annual joint exercise of Pacific Islands Forum nations, intended to combat illegal fishing.  The first exercise took place in 2005.

The nations of the Pacific Forum run a Forum Fisheries Agency (FFA).  The FFA uses the resources of its member countries to run a Regional Fisheries Surveillance Centre (RFSC).

Operation Kurukuru 2014
114 fishing vessels were boarded, and inspected, during Operation Kurukuru 2014.

Operation Kurukuru 2017
Semi Koroilvesau, the Minister for Fisheries for Fiji, addressed recruits at Fiji's military's training centre at Vatuwaqa on 19 June 2017, reminding them of the importance in enforcing Fiji's Exclusive Economic Zone, and the importance of its participation in the annual Operation Kurukuru exercises.

References

Fishing in Oceania